The A9 autoroute (La Languedocienne/La Catalane) is a motorway in southern France.

The road forms part of the European route E15, as does the A9 road (Scotland). The road runs between Orange and Perthus, in the Pyrénées-Orientales at the frontier with Spain where it becomes the Autopista AP-7.

The route passes the following major towns and cities Perpignan (Pyrénées-Orientales), Narbonne (Aude), Béziers and Montpellier (Hérault), Nîmes (Gard) and Orange (Vaucluse) before joining the A7 autoroute (Marseille to Lyon). The route is 2x3 as far south as exit 41 (Perpignan-Nord); widening between exit 41 and the Spanish frontier is currently (2012) in progress.

The A9 autoroute was operated by the Autoroutes du Sud de la France (ASF), taken over in 2006 by Vinci Autoroutes. The cost of travelling the whole road through the Languedoc-Roussillon region in a car is 23.70 euros (from 1 February 2012).

Montpellier 
Around Montpellier the road splits into the A9 and the A709, the latter of which is toll-free. Exits 28 to 32 (inclusive) of the A9 can be reached only from the A709. If one accidentally stays on the A9, the distance can be up to 35 km to the next exit.

Junctions 

  A9-A7 Junction
  21: (Orange) : town served Orange
  Aires de repos : Roquemaure
  22: (Roquemaure) 14 km : towns served Roquemaure, Villeneuve-lès-Avignon and Avignon
  Aire de Tavel
  Aires de repos : Estézargues 
   23: (Remoulins) 29 km : towns served Remoulins and Avignon
  Aires de repos : Lédenon  
  Aire de Marguerittes 
   24: (Nîmes-Est) 47 km : towns served  Nîmes
   25: (Nîmes-Ouest) 55 km : towns served Nîmes
  A9-A54Junction 
  Aires de repos : Milhaud, Gard
  Aires de repos : Vergèze
   26: (Gallargues) 73 km : towns served Aimargues and Aigues-Mortes
  Aire d'Ambrussum
   27: (Lunel) 79 km : towns served Lunel
  Aires de repos : Nabrigas
  Aires de repos : Mas du Roux
Exits 28-32 (inclusive) are no longer on the main A9 (as of May 30, 2017); you have to follow *Montpellier* and get on the A709.
 (A709)  Péage
 (A709)  28: (Vendargues) 90 km : towns served Vendargues and Montpellier
 (A709)  Aires de repos : Saint-Aunès
 (A709)  29:  (Montpellier-Est) 97 km : towns served Montpellier and La Grande-Motte
 (A709)  30: (Montpellier) 101 km : towns served Montpellier and Palavas-les-Flots
 (A709)  31: (Montpellier) 103 km : towns served Montpellier and Palavas-les-Flots
 (A709)  32: (Montpellier) 106 km : towns served Montpellier
 (A709)  Péage
Exits 28-32 (inclusive) are no longer on the main A9 (as of May 30, 2017); you have to follow *Montpellier* and get on the A709.
  Aire de Montpellier-Fabrègues
  Aires de repos : Gigean
   33: (Sète) 130 km : towns served Balaruc-le-Vieux and Sète
  Aires de repos : Mèze (Southbound), Loupian (Northbound)
  Aires de repos : Floransac
   34: (Agde-Pézenas) 155 km : towns served Agde and Pézenas
  Aire de Béziers-Montblanc
  A9-A75 Junction: towns served Béziers
   36: (Béziers-Ouest) 173 km : towns served Béziers
  Aires de repos : Lespignan
  Aire de Narbonne-Vinassan
   37: (Narbonne-Est) 195 km : towns served Narbonne
   38: (Narbonne-Sud) 198 km : towns served Narbonne
  A9-A61 Junction
  Aires de repos : Prat-de-Cest (Southbound), Bages (Northbound)
   39: (Sigean) 215 km : towns served Sigean
  Aires de repos : Gasparets (Southbound), Sigean (Northbound)
  Aire de La Palme
   40: (Leucate) 226 km : towns served Port-Leucate
  Aires de repos : Fitou
  Aires de repos : Château de Salses 
   41: (Perpignan-Nord) 248 km : towns served Rivesaltes, Port-Barcarès and Perpignan
  Aires de repos : Rivesaltes (Southbound), Pia (northbound)
   42: (Perpignan-Sud) 262 km : towns served Perpignan and Bourg-Madame
  Aires de repos : Les Pavillons
  Aire Village Catalan
   43: (Le Boulou) 275 km : towns served Le Boulou, Port-Vendres and Céret
  Péage
  Aires de repos : Les Contrôles
 Customs Post (French and Spanish), The A9 continues 1 km before becoming the AP-7
 Spain

References

External links 
 Site d'ASF
 Project to improve the Autoroute A9
 Autoroute A9 on Saratlas

A09